The Pori is a tribe from the Centre and East Provinces of Cameroon.

Ethnic groups in Cameroon